Anne Charlotte Edgren-Leffler, duchess of Cajanello (1 October 184921 October 1892), was a Swedish author.

Biography
She was the daughter of the school principal John Olof Leffler and Gustava Wilhelmina Mittag. Her brother was noted mathematician Gösta Mittag-Leffler. Leffler was initially educated privately and then a student at the Wallinska skolan from the age of thirteen, at that time perhaps the most progressive school open to females in Stockholm.

Leffler had married G. Edgren in 1872, but about 1884 she was separated from her husband, who did not share her advanced views.

She was also active within the women's movement. Leffler was an early member of the women's association Nya Idun, founded in 1885, and was one of its committee members. At its first meeting, she spoke in favour of the Victorian dress reform and raised the issue of dress reform in Sweden, which resulted in the foundation of the Swedish Dress Reform Association.

Her dramatic method forms a connecting link between Ibsen and Strindberg, and its masculine directness, freedom from prejudice and frankness won her work great esteem in Sweden. Her last book was a biography (1892) of her friend Sofia Kovalevskaya, by way of introduction to Sonya's autobiography. An English translation (1895) by Annie de Furuhjelm and A. M. Clive Bayley contains a biographical note on Fräu Edgren-Leffler by Lily Wolffsohn, based on private sources.

Leffler died in 1892 of complications from appendicitis in Naples, Italy.

Notes

Further reading

External links
 
 

1849 births
1892 deaths
Swedish women dramatists and playwrights
19th-century Swedish dramatists and playwrights
19th-century Swedish women writers
Socialist feminists
Members of Nya Idun